The Siren Call is a 1922 American drama silent film directed by Irvin Willat and written by Philip D. Hurn, Victor Irvin and J.E. Nash. Starring Dorothy Dalton, David Powell, Mitchell Lewis, Ed Brady, Will Walling, Leigh Wyant and Lucien Littlefield, it was released on September 17, 1922, by Paramount Pictures.

Premise
A love triangle set against the gold rush days in Alaska.

Cast
Dorothy Dalton as Charlotte Woods
David Powell as Ralph Stevens
Mitchell Lewis as Beauregard
Ed Brady as Edward Brent
Will Walling as Gore
Leigh Wyant as Eleanor Du Bois
Lucien Littlefield as Irishman
George B. Williams as Judge Green

Preservation status
The film survives in the George Eastman House archive and in Moscow's Gosfilmofond archive.

References

External links

1922 films
1920s English-language films
Silent American drama films
1922 drama films
Paramount Pictures films
Films directed by Irvin Willat
American black-and-white films
American silent feature films
1920s American films